WRTW is a Christian radio station licensed to Crown Point, Indiana, broadcasting on 90.5 MHz FM.  It is owned by Hyles Anderson College. Its studios are located in the former federal courthouse and post office building on State Street in Downtown Hammond.

WRTW airs traditional Christian music and locally produced Christian talk and teaching programs, as well as national programs such as Thru the Bible with J. Vernon McGee, Family Altar with Lester Roloff, and Unshackled! The station has also aired local high school sports games.

History

Hyles-Anderson College first applied for a construction permit to build a station at 90.5 FM in 1989. However, Moody Bible Institute filed a competing application for the frequency and was granted a construction permit to build a station, which was to simulcast WMBI-FM. Moody's station was never built, and Hyles-Anderson was granted a construction permit in 2007. The station began broadcasting in May 2010.

Simulcast
In 2010, Hyles-Anderson College purchased the construction permit for a new radio station at 90.5 FM in Paxton, Illinois from the California Association for Research and Education, Inc. for $15,000. On May 14, 2012, WRTW began to be simulcast on 90.5 WRTK in Paxton, covering East-Central Illinois.

References

External links
WRTW Station website

RTW
Radio stations established in 2010
2010 establishments in Indiana